Ceduna is a town in South Australia located on the shores of Murat Bay on the west coast of Eyre Peninsula. It lies west of the junction of the Flinders and Eyre Highways around 786 km northwest of the capital Adelaide.  The port town/suburb of Thevenard lies 3 km to the west on Cape Thevenard.  It is in the District Council of Ceduna, the federal Division of Grey, and the state electoral district of Flinders.

The name Ceduna is a corruption of the local Aboriginal Wirangu word Chedoona and is said to mean a place to sit down and rest.

The town has played an important but minor role in Australia's overall development due to it being a fishing port and a railway hub.

History

Ceduna is on the land of the Wirangu people.

Matthew Flinders, on his voyage in the Investigator, anchored in Fowlers Bay on 28 January 1802. He went on to explore the coast and named Denial Bay, Smoky Bay and the islands of Nuyts Archipelago. He was disappointed to find no river and gave the name Denial Bay because of the deceptive hope we had formed of penetrating by it some distance into the interior of the country.

French expedition leader Nicolas Baudin visited Murat Bay after meeting with Flinders and named it after Joachim Murat. He also named the point of Thevenard after the Admiral and Minister of Marine Antoine-Jean-Marie Thevenard, and Decres Bay after Denis Decres, duke of the First French Empire.

The first European exploration of the hinterland was during August–September 1839 by John Hill and Samuel Stephens, using the chartered brig Rapid as a base. Hill reported to Governor Gawler that although the bay was 'valuable', the hinterland was 'waterless', thereby stalling European interest.

There was a whaling station on nearby St Peter Island during the 1850s before settlement.

The Commissioner of Crown Lands, faced with widespread agitation to open West Coast lands for agricultural settlement, invited three farmers in July 1887 to inspect the lands between Streaky Bay and Western Australia. They were optimistic about the area and recommended that the necessary surveys be started at once. In 1889 the Government in Adelaide formalised the Far West with survey lines.

In June 1901, the town of Ceduna was proclaimed. For many years, locals called the township Murat Bay and it was not until the railways came and called the siding Ceduna in 1915 that locals adopted the name. The Ceduna Jetty was built in 1902.

The Tod Water pipeline was officially opened by Mr M McIntosh, Commissioner of Public Works, June 1928.

Ceduna was the site of a major satellite telecommunications facility operated by the Overseas Telecommunications Commission. It was a major employer in the town until made redundant by technological change. It was built in 1969 and by 1984 almost half of Australia's International telecommunication traffic passed through Ceduna's Earth Station. The dish is now operated remotely and used as a radio astronomy observatory by the University of Tasmania.

On 4 December 2002, Ceduna received international attention when the path of totality of a solar eclipse passed directly over the town. Though the day had at times been partly cloudy, and although mere kilometres away in Thevenard the view was still clouded over, the southwestern sky where the Sun and Moon were located was clear from Ceduna itself at the time of the total solar eclipse, late in the afternoon.

In the 2007/2008 State Budget, Premier Mike Rann (who had opened the new Ceduna TAFE campus in the early 1990s) announced a commitment of $36 million for Stage 1 of the Ceduna Hospital Redevelopment. It was opened in 2011.

In February 2010 Premier Mike Rann opened the world's largest mineral sands mine, Jacinth-Ambrosia Mine, operated by Iluka Resources. The $390 million mine is located 200 km north west of Ceduna.

Population
According to the 2021 census of Population, there were 3,505 people in Ceduna.
 Aboriginal and Torres Strait Islander people made up 16.4% of the population. 
 79.2% of people were born in Australia and 82.1% of people spoke only English at home. 
 The most common response for religion was No Religion at 33.7%.

Description

The town is the last major settlement before crossing the Nullarbor Plain from east to west. It is set on Murat Bay and the sandy coves, sheltered bays and offshore islands of the bay make it a popular base for a beach holiday. The foreshore at Ceduna is lined with Norfolk Island pine trees. There is a jetty for walking, fishing and small boats.

Demographics
In the  the Ceduna urban area had a population of 2,289, and the Ceduna council area a population of 3,480.

Ceduna has a number of Indigenous homelands situated within 20–30 minutes of the town.  These are groupings of Indigenous families who have chosen to live together.  The council area has the highest percentage of Aboriginal people of all local government areas in South Australia, with the population currently standing at 24.8% (911) of the population. A number of Aboriginal communities in adjacent unincorporated areas rely on the available services in Ceduna and use the town as a base for a variety of reasons.

Very few of the indigenous inhabitants of Ceduna continue to speak the Wirangu language. As the regional service town, Ceduna attracts indigenous people from many language groups in western South Australia. The Far West Languages Centre (FWLC) was established in 2006 to maintain three local Endangered languages including Wirangu, along with Mirning and Kokatha.

Education
The two schools in Ceduna are Crossways Lutheran School and Ceduna Area School (CAS). Crossways has around 150 students from Reception to Year 10, approximately 80% of whom are Indigenous. CAS has approximately 600 students, from Reception to Year 12, with approximately 25% of Indigenous students.

Economic activity
Iluka Resources developed a mineral sands mine at Jacinth- Ambrosia which relies on Ceduna as a service town.
A major residential development called Ceduna Waters was developed by Carramatta Holdings, a significant South Australian property developer in early 2010. Ceduna Waters is approximately 3 km from the town centre and is approximately 30% occupied as of May 2013.

Prospectively, the development was projected to result in the growth of the population of Ceduna by over 10%. The development will allow for the provision of additional residential accommodation in Ceduna to meet the needs of workers at the Jacinth-Ambrosia mine.

The Thevenard port of Ceduna is a high-frequency deep sea port which exports grain, salt, mineral sand and gypsum, all which are found within the local region.

Aquaculture remains a major industry in Ceduna with pacific oyster growing a key activity in the region. In recent years deep sea fishing and tuna fishing have attracted industries from Port Lincoln to the region.

In 2012, BP commenced the ability to seek approval for oil drilling off the nearby Great Australian Bight. BP is currently investing $20 million into a study of the region's ecosystem and social and economic potential.

Scientific research

Ceduna has a radio telescope that is integrated into the CSIRO radio telescope network. Telstra donated the dish to the University of Tasmania in 1996 for use as a radio astronomy observatory. It is still in active use.

Ceduna is also a hub for research on southern bluefin tuna and is ideally located data collection through methods including aerial spotting.

Cultural festivals
Ceduna's annual Oysterfest is a major attraction held on the South Australia Labour Day long weekend. It was established in 1991.  Attracting over 6000 people, it celebrates the oyster industry in the clean waters of SA's far-west coast, with a wide variety of activities, including a gala dinner, celebrity chefs, live concerts, children's amusements and a street parade. The finale is marked by a fireworks display.

In media

Ceduna was used as a major filming location for the 1997 film Kiss or Kill starring Frances O'Connor. It was a key setting for the factual drama Black and White although the township was not used as a filming location. In 2012 Ceduna was featured in the independent feature film Nullarbor Nymph which achieved cult status around the country.

The Cashless Welfare Card began a trial there in March 2016, attracting media attention.

Tourism
Ceduna is known as the gateway to the Nullarbor Plain and being on the National Highway its traffic flow is over 240,000 vehicles a year. The township has five caravan parks, four motels and one accommodating hotel. The tourism industry is driven by the nearby conservation parks, beaches and fishing opportunities.

Environment

Climate

Ceduna experiences a cold semi-arid climate (Köppen: BSk, Trewartha: BSbl); with warm, dry summers; mild to warm, dry springs and autumns; and mild, relatively dry winters. June is the wettest month. The average yearly precipitation is just under 300mm at the coast and diminishes northward into the interior, becoming increasingly arid. Goyder's Line, which demarcates the edge of the area where rainfall is generally sufficient to support agriculture, starts near Ceduna. On 19 December 2019, the maximum temperature of 48.9 °C was recorded.

Notable people
 Jenny Borlase (née Kennett), former netballer, born in Ceduna
 Krista Eleftheriou, journalist and former television presenter, raised in Ceduna
 Kym LeBois, professional AFL footballer playing for Carlton Football Club
 Scott Lycett, professional AFL footballer playing for Port Adelaide Football Club
 Jodi Martin, singer/songwriter, born and raised in Ceduna
 Terry Milera, professional AFL footballer who played for St Kilda Football Club
 Tyson Stengle, professional AFL footballer playing for Adelaide Football Club
 Chris Sperou, aerobatic pilot, born in Ceduna in 1938

See also

 Ceduna Airport
 Point Bell Conservation Park

References

External links

 
 West Coast Sentinel newspaper report 27 August 2009

Coastal towns in South Australia
Eyre Peninsula
Fishing communities in Australia
Great Australian Bight
Eyre Highway